Murugesu Chandrakumar is a  Sri Lankan Politician .He was a member of the Parliament of Sri Lanka and the Deputy Chairman of Committees. He belongs to the Eelam People's Democratic Party. However, he contested under the symbol of United People's Freedom Alliance He quit the Eelam People's Democratic Party and contested independently in 2020 Sri Lankan parliamentary elections.

References

Members of the 10th Parliament of Sri Lanka
Members of the 14th Parliament of Sri Lanka
United People's Freedom Alliance politicians
1964 births
Living people
Sri Lankan Hindus
Eelam People's Democratic Party politicians
Deputy chairmen of committees of the Parliament of Sri Lanka